The Koornmarktspoort is city gate in Kampen, Overijssel, the Netherlands. It was originally part of the city wall and is the oldest of the Kampen city gates.

History
The central block and gate are fourteenth century and the two towers facing the river are probably from a later date. The rear of the building opens on the Koornmarkt (wheat market square), and the front faces the river IJssel.

References

 website with history of the gate
Kampen, Overijssel
Rijksmonuments in Overijssel